Checca District is the largest of eight districts in the Canas Province in Peru. Its seat is Checca.

Geography 
Other mountains are listed below:

Ethnic groups 
The people in the district are mainly indigenous citizens of Quechua descent. Quechua is the language which the majority of the population (98.68%) learnt to speak in childhood, 1.10% of the residents started speaking using the Spanish language (2007 Peru Census).

References

External links
  Municipal website